Céline Burkart (born 25 April 1995) is a Swiss badminton player. She competed at the 2015 and 2019 European Games. Burkart was a runner-up at the 2014 Slovak Open in the mixed doubles event partnered with Oliver Schaller, and later won the Swiss International tournament after beat the French pair. They were taken to three games, a match that saw them drop their first set of the tournament. They were steadied to take the match and the title 21–19 in the deciding set.

Achievements

BWF International Challenge/Series (2 titles, 1 runner-up) 
Mixed doubles

  BWF International Challenge tournament
  BWF International Series tournament
  BWF Future Series tournament

References

External links 
 

Living people
1995 births
People from Muri District
Swiss female badminton players
Badminton players at the 2015 European Games
Badminton players at the 2019 European Games
European Games competitors for Switzerland
Sportspeople from Aargau
21st-century Swiss women